Kirindy Forest or Kirindy Private Reserve is a private park situated in western Madagascar, More precisely, the reserve is situated 50 km northeast of the town of Morondava. The Forest goes through two apparent seasons throughout the year, the dry season from March to December and the rainy season from December to March.6. The forest is home to a wide variety of both Fauna and Flora. Ranging from Lemurs to geckos. Many species of trees are also growing in the forest with a wide variety of endemic trees. The forest was earlier operated based on an experimental sustainable timber harvesting scheme, which has not left indelible scars on the region. It is said in Malagasy cultures that the forest was named Kirindy because Kirindy means in malagasy "dense forest with wild animals". As it is located in the northern area of the Kirindy Mitea National Park, the forest is also known as "Kirindy Nord", meaning northern Kirindy. Before being renamed Kirindy, the forest was called the Swiss people's forest, "la foret des Suisses" as a Swiss company owns the piece of land.

Geography and climate

Location 
The Kirindy forest is located in western Madagascar, within the Kirindy Mitea National Park. It is situated 700 km away from the capital of the country, Antananarivo. Located in Central Menabe, it is part of a conservation priority area. The forest is in the Toliary (Tuléar) Province, situated 60 km south-west of the town of Morondava and approximately 21 km east of Belo‐sur‐Mer. Located at 44°39'E and 200 03'S. The Kirindy Forest is said to be one of the largest areas of protected dry forest in Madagascar. It is known for having a unique level of biodiversity.

Climate 
The Krindy Forest's climate is highly seasonal and tropical. The cold and dry season generally takes place from March - April to November - December of each year. A season during which most trees shed their leaves. The wet and hot season, also referred to as the rainy season typically takes place from November - December to March - April. Some precipitations can be observed during this season which make the forest that makes access more difficult' hard to access The annual rainfall is concentrated throughout the brief rainy season with an average of approximately 800mm of rainfall every year in the region. Temperatures range yearly between 19 °C and 40 °C((104 °F)) with an annual mean of 25 °C.

Fauna 
The Fauna includes over sixty-five species of reptiles and amphibians. Fifty-five species of birds were also identified in the forest as well as thirty-one species of mammals.

Mammals 
There are a number of species of nocturnal lemurs present: Madame Berthe's mouse lemur (the world's smallest primate), red-tailed sportive lemur, pygmy mouse lemur, gray mouse lemur, pale fork-marked lemur, Coquerel's giant mouse lemur, Verreaux's sifaka, red-fronted brown lemur, and the fat-tailed dwarf lemur. 
Most of the species in the Kirindy forest are endemic and endangered due to different threats. Dozens of endemic lemurs are present in the Kirindy forest weighting from 0.02 kg to 7 kg. Two species are endemic to this specific region. The Malagasy giant jumping rat (Hypogeomys antimena) endangered due to multiple factors such as habitat loss, slow reproduction, and limited range. Kirindy Forest may be best known as the only location where the endangered giant jumping rat (Hypogeomys antimena) occurs.  This animal can hop like a miniature kangaroo, but is also seen walking on all four limbs. The Madame Berthe's mouse lemur (Microcebus berthae), a nocturnal primate. This primate is the smallest primate in the world (Gron 2009. The Lepilemur ruficaudatus is also present in the forest, a nocturnal lemur that weights on average 800 g. Red-fronted Brown Lemurs (Eulemur fulvus rufus) can also be observed in Kirindy Forest.
These mammals include various species of lemurs.  but further mammalian species of fossa, narrow-striped mongoose, common tenrec, greater hedgehog tenrec and are also found here. The Fossa is also one of the 31 species of mammals inhabiting the forest. According to, by 2050, this species will go extinct if the deforestation rates stay this high.

Amphibians and Reptiles 
Madagascar is home to a great number of endemic species, Ninety‐nine per cent of Madagascar's known amphibians and 95% of Madagascar's reptiles are endemic. Kirindy Forest has around 50 species of reptiles, including  11 species of snakes and 7 species of chameleons. Some of the local reptiles present are: Labord's chameleon, various plated lizards, Henkel's leaf-tailed gecko, big-headed gecko, Madagascar ground boa, giant hog-nosed snake, spear-nosed snake and kapidolo. 99 per cent of Madagascar's frogs are endemic. This high rate of endemicity is due to the isolation of the island and the fact that it has experienced insularity for a long time. About 4 per cent of the world's anuran species are found only in Madagascar. Various amphibians are present in the forest. They can all be grouped into three different families. The Ptychadenidae with the Ptychadena mascareniensis, a frog ranging between 35 and 40mm. This species is active throughout the day. The Mocquardʹs rain frog’ is part of the Microhylidae family. It is one of Madagascar's smallest amphibians. It is active at night only during the rainy season. The frog spends the dry season buried underground. The forest is also home to the Antsohy tomato frog’, another amphibian of the microhylidae family. The Mantellidae family has been newly defined and is said to be the largest lineage of frogs on Madagascar. Madagascar has both the largest and smallest species of Chameleons in the world, the forest being home to two species. The Furcifer nicosiaithat can only be found in the Kirindy Forest and in the Tsingy de Bemaraha. The Furcifer oustaleti, the largest chameleon in the world as it can reach a total length of 680mm.

Flora 
[[File:Adansonia Grandidieri Baobab Morondava Madagascar.jpg|thumb|right|'Adansonia grandidieri]]

 Trees and Plants 
Madagascar is known to have a very rich flora with thousands of different species of trees and plants. The Kirindy forest is home to much endemic flora. Three main species of baobab trees can be found there. Most of the canopy top is about 14 meters in height, but in wetter parts (e.g. in riparian zones) it may almost triple in vertical extent. There are three species of baobab trees present: Adansonia grandidieri, Adansonia rubrostipa and Adansonia za''. The Adansonia rubrostipa also known as fony baobab. It usually has a bottle shaped trunk with major horizontal branches. It can range between 5 and 20 meters. The Adansonia za, a tall tree that ranges from 20 to 30 meters also grows in the forest. Another baobab species endemic to the forest is the Adansonia grandidieri, also known as Grandidier's baobab. This endemic tree is the biggest of the six species of baobab. Measuring up to 30 meters.

Fruits 
These trees and plants develop an important number of fruits yearly which are contributing to the biodiversity of the forest. By the beginning of the rainy season, these fruits contain both seeds and pulp of high nutritive value which attract many insects and animals. The fruits produced in the Kirindy Forest are mainly baobab tree fruits. These fruits usually ripe from the end of the dry season. They are rich in vitamin C. They are used for human food and livestock. They are also eaten by lemurs. The fruits contain seeds and roots that are little used. They can however be sold in Toliara. Another common fruit in the forest is the Baudouinia fluggeiformis Baill.

Threats and conservation

Deforestation 
The highest rate of deforestation in Madagascar between 2000 and 2005 was observed in spiny and dry forests. With rates respectively, at 1.11% and 0.42% per year.The region has also suffered from a really high rate of deforestation with more than 30% of the spiny forest
lost between 1970 and 2000. In the last 20 years, the local population of Central Menabe has been subject to marginalisation since more than 40000 ha of land were converted into rice fields. These fields were granted to the expatriates and Malagasy “elites”. These conversions have been a threat to the local population and fauna and flora of the region.  The forest in particular has been impacted.  The loss of faunal diversity is worsened by forest fragmentation. As the forest patches are too small to support viable populations. Mass deforestation remains present within the Kirindy region and has significantly increased in the last few years. Around 1000 hectares of forest were deforested each year from between 2000 and 2009. By 2014, this number had risen to 4000 hectares per year.

Fires 
Due to a record number of fires, the loss of forests could reach 44.9% in 2020 and 83.1% by 2025. Many human - induced fires are also a source of endangerment to the Forest. Many factors such as forest layers, structure, species, richness, diversity, and composition are damaged and disturbed due to the fires. It is said that thousands of kilometres of forest are burnt down each year for the development of agriculture. Fires in the Kirindy forest are mainly caused by hunters, honey collectors or cattle breeders. Between 1984 and 2009 more than 83 hectares of forest were burnt down during the dry season (from May to October). Despite these recurrent fires, the more open canopy of the trees present allow a quicker natural regeneration process. It has been stated that fires in the Kirindy Forest tend to impact both the forest structure altering it's biodiversity of both Fauna and Flora but also the middle forest layer. According to scientists, the forest can recover within 12 years of a fire disturbance incident by respecting the tree density, basal area and species richness and diversity. 
However, the forest remains truly damaged as even 27 years later, the composition of the forest is still significantly different and altered.

Natural disasters 
The Kirindy forest has also been threatened in the past by various natural disasters such as cyclones and hurricanes. The latest one being the Fanele Cyclone, assessed as a category 3 storm.  with sustained winds of 185 km/h and gusts up to 260 km/h according to Reunion Meteo France. This cyclone had an immediate impact on the forest and threatened much of its biodiversity. According to Whitehurst et al., 2009, Reforestation is the only apparent solution to preventing and reversing species loss. For now, all reforestation processes are natural. No initiatives of reforestation are on the way.

Gallery

See also
Madagascar succulent woodlands

References

Protected areas of Madagascar
Madagascar succulent woodlands